Twenty Thousand Leagues Under the Seas is a classic science fiction adventure novel by French writer Jules Verne.

A deluxe octavo edition, published by Hetzel in November 1871, included 111 illustrations by Alphonse de Neuville and Édouard Riou. The book was widely acclaimed on its release and remains so; it is regarded as one of the premier adventure novels and one of Verne's greatest works, along with Around the World in Eighty Days and Journey to the Center of the Earth. Its depiction of Captain Nemo's underwater ship, the Nautilus, is regarded as ahead of its time, since it accurately describes many features of today's submarines, which in the 1860s were comparatively primitive vessels.

A model of the French submarine Plongeur (launched in 1863) figured at the 1867 Exposition Universelle, where Jules Verne examined it and was inspired by it when writing his novel.

Title
The title refers to the distance traveled under the various seas: 20,000 metric leagues (80,000 km, over 40,000 nautical miles), nearly twice the circumference of the Earth.

Principal characters
Professor Pierre Aronnax – the narrator of the story, a French natural scientist.
Conseil – Aronnax's Flemish servant, very devoted to him and knowledgeable in biological classification.
Ned Land – a Canadian harpooner, described as having "no equal in his dangerous trade."
Captain Nemo – the designer and captain of the Nautilus.

Plot

During the year 1866, ships of various nationalities sight a mysterious sea monster, which, it is later suggested, might be a gigantic narwhal. The U.S. government assembles an expedition in New York City to find and destroy the monster. Professor Pierre Aronnax, a French marine biologist and the story's narrator, is in town at the time and receives a last-minute invitation to join the expedition; he accepts. Canadian whaler and master harpooner Ned Land and Aronnax's faithful manservant Conseil are also among the participants.

The expedition leaves Brooklyn aboard the United States Navy frigate Abraham Lincoln, then travels south around Cape Horn into the Pacific Ocean. After a five-month search ending off Japan, the frigate locates and attacks the monster, which damages the ship's rudder. Aronnax and Land are hurled into the sea, and Conseil jumps into the water after them. They survive by climbing onto the "monster", which, they are startled to find, is a futuristic submarine. They wait on the deck of the vessel until morning, when they are captured, hauled inside, and introduced to the submarine's mysterious constructor and commander, Captain Nemo.

The rest of the novel describes the protagonists' adventures aboard the Nautilus, which was built in secrecy and now roams the seas beyond the reach of land-based governments. In self-imposed exile, Captain Nemo seems to have a dual motivation — a quest for scientific knowledge and a desire to escape terrestrial civilization. Nemo explains that his submarine is electrically powered and can conduct advanced marine research; he also tells his new passengers that his secret existence means he cannot let them leave — they must remain on board permanently.

They visit many ocean regions, some factual and others fictitious. The travelers view coral formations, sunken vessels from the Battle of Vigo Bay, the Antarctic ice barrier, the Transatlantic telegraph cable, and the legendary underwater realm of Atlantis. They even travel to the South Pole and are trapped in an upheaval of an iceberg on the way back, caught in a narrow gallery of ice from which they are forced to dig themselves out. The passengers also don diving suits, hunt sharks and other marine fauna with air guns in the underwater forests of Crespo Island, and also attend an undersea funeral for a crew member who died during a mysterious collision experienced by the Nautilus. When the submarine returns to the Atlantic Ocean, a school of giant squid ("devilfish") attacks the vessel and kills another crewman.

The novel's later pages suggest that Captain Nemo went into undersea exile after his homeland was conquered and his family slaughtered by a powerful imperialist nation. Following the episode of the devilfish, Nemo largely avoids Aronnax, who begins to side with Ned Land. Ultimately, the Nautilus is  attacked by a warship from the mysterious nation that has caused Nemo such suffering. Carrying out his quest for revenge, Nemo — whom Aronnax dubs an "archangel of hatred" — rams the ship below her waterline and sends her to the bottom, much to the professor's horror. Afterward, Nemo kneels before a portrait of his deceased wife and children, then sinks into a deep depression.

Circumstances aboard the submarine change drastically: watches are no longer kept, and the vessel wanders about aimlessly. Ned becomes so reclusive that Conseil fears for the harpooner's life. One morning, however, Ned announces that they are in sight of land and have a chance to escape. Professor Aronnax is more than ready to leave Captain Nemo, who now horrifies him, yet he is still drawn to the man. Fearing that Nemo's very presence could weaken his resolve, he avoids contact with the captain. Before their departure, however, the professor eavesdrops on Nemo and overhears him calling out in anguish, "O almighty God! Enough! Enough!" Aronnax immediately joins his companions, and they carry out their escape plans, but as they board the submarine's skiff, they realize that the Nautilus has seemingly blundered into the ocean's deadliest whirlpool, the Moskenstraumen, more commonly known as the "Maelstrom". Nevertheless, they manage to escape and find refuge on an island off the coast of Norway. The submarine's ultimate fate, however, remains unknown.

Themes and subtext

Captain Nemo's assumed name recalls Homer's Odyssey, when Odysseus encounters the monstrous Cyclops Polyphemus in the course of his wanderings. Polyphemus asks Odysseus his name, and Odysseus replies that it is Outis 'no one', translated into Latin as "Nemo". Like Captain Nemo, Odysseus wanders the seas in exile (though only for 10 years) and similarly grieves the tragic deaths of his crewmen.

The novel repeatedly mentions the U.S. Naval Commander Matthew Fontaine Maury, an oceanographer who investigated the winds, seas, and currents, collected samples from the  depths, and charted the world's oceans. Maury was internationally famous, and Verne may have known of his French ancestry.

The novel alludes to other Frenchmen, including Lapérouse, the celebrated explorer whose two sloops of war vanished during a voyage of global circumnavigation; Dumont d'Urville, a later explorer who found the remains of one of Lapérouse's ships; and Ferdinand de Lesseps, builder of the Suez Canal and nephew of the sole survivor of Lapérouse's ill-fated expedition. The Nautilus follows in the footsteps of these men: she visits the waters where Lapérouse's vessels disappeared; she enters Torres Strait and becomes stranded there, as did d'Urville's ship, the Astrolabe; and she passes beneath the Suez Canal via a fictitious underwater tunnel joining the Red Sea to the Mediterranean.

In possibly the novel's most famous episode, the above-cited battle with a school of giant squid, one of the monsters captures a crew member. Reflecting on the battle in the next chapter, Aronnax writes: "To convey such sights, it would take the pen of our most renowned poet, Victor Hugo, author of The Toilers of the Sea." A bestselling novel in Verne's day, The Toilers of the Sea also features a threatening cephalopod: a laborer battles with an octopus, believed by  critics to be symbolic of the Industrial Revolution. Certainly Verne was influenced by Hugo's novel, and, in penning this variation on its octopus encounter, he may have intended the symbol to also take in the Revolutions of 1848.

Other symbols and themes pique modern critics. Margaret Drabble, for instance, argues that Verne's  masterwork also anticipated the ecology movement and influenced French avant-garde imagery. As for additional motifs in the novel, Captain Nemo repeatedly champions the world's persecuted and downtrodden. While in Mediterranean waters, the captain provides financial support to rebels resisting Ottoman rule during the Cretan Revolt of 1866–1869, proving to Professor Aronnax that he hadn't severed all relations with terrestrial mankind. In another episode, Nemo rescues an Indian pearl diver from a shark attack, then gives the fellow a pouch full of pearls, more than the man could have gathered after years of his hazardous work. Nemo remarks later that the diver, as a native of British India, "lives in the land of the oppressed".

Indeed, the novel has an under-the-counter political vision, hinted at in the character and background of Captain Nemo himself. In the book's final form, Nemo says to professor Aronnax, "That Indian, sir, is an inhabitant of an oppressed country; and I am still, and shall be, to my last breath, one of them!" In the novel's initial drafts, the mysterious captain was a Polish nobleman, whose family and homeland were slaughtered by Russian forces during the Polish January Uprising of 1863. However, these specifics were suppressed during the editing stages at the insistence of Verne's publisher Pierre-Jules Hetzel, believed responsible by today's scholars for many modifications of Verne's original manuscripts. At the time France was a putative ally of the Russian Empire, hence Hetzel demanded that Verne suppress the identity of Nemo's enemy, not only to avoid political complications but also to avert lower sales should the novel appear in Russian translation. Hence Professor Aronnax never discovers Nemo's origins.

Even so, a trace remains of the novel's initial concept, a detail that may have eluded Hetzel: its allusion to an unsuccessful rebellion under a Polish hero, Tadeusz Kościuszko, leader of the uprising against Russian and Prussian control in 1794; Kościuszko mourned his country's prior defeat with the Latin exclamation "Finis Poloniae!" ("Poland is no more!").

Five years later, and again at Hetzel's insistence, Captain Nemo was revived and revamped for another Verne novel The Mysterious Island. It alters the captain's nationality from Polish to Indian, changing him into a fictional descendant of Tipu Sultan, a prominent ruler of Mysore who fought against the British East India Company in the Anglo-Mysore Wars. Thus, Nemo's unnamed enemy is converted into France's traditional antagonist, the British Empire. Born as an Indian aristocrat, one Prince Dakkar, Nemo participated in a major 19th-century uprising, the Indian Rebellion of 1857, which was ultimately quashed by the British. After his family was killed by the British, Nemo fled beneath the seas, then made a final reappearance in the later novel's concluding pages.

Verne took the name "Nautilus" from one of the earliest successful submarines, built in 1800 by Robert Fulton, who also invented the first commercially successful steamboat. Fulton named his submarine after a marine mollusk, the chambered nautilus. As noted above, Verne also studied a model of the newly developed French Navy submarine Plongeur at the 1867 Exposition Universelle, which guided him in his development of the novel's Nautilus.

The diving gear used by passengers on the Nautilus is presented as a combination of two existing systems: 1) the surface-supplied hardhat suit, which was fed oxygen from the shore through tubes; 2) a later, self-contained apparatus designed by Benoit Rouquayrol and Auguste Denayrouze in 1865. Their invention featured tanks fastened to the back, which supplied air to a facial mask via the first-known demand regulator. The diver didn't swim but walked upright across the seafloor. This device was called an aérophore (Greek for "air-carrier"). Its air tanks could hold only thirty atmospheres, however Nemo claims that his futuristic adaptation could do far better: "The Nautilus'''s pumps allow me to store air under considerable pressure ... my diving equipment can supply breathable air for nine or ten hours."

Recurring themes in later books
As noted above, Hetzel and Verne generated a sequel of sorts to this novel: L'Île mystérieuse (The Mysterious Island, 1874), which attempts to round off narratives begun in Twenty Thousand Leagues Under the Seas and Captain Grant's Children, a.k.a. In Search of the Castaways. While The Mysterious Island attempts to provide additional background on Nemo (or Prince Dakkar), it is muddled by irreconcilable chronological discrepancies between the two books and even within The Mysterious Island itself.

Verne returned to the theme of an outlaw submarine captain in his much later Facing the Flag (1896). This novel's chief villain, Ker Karraje, is simply an unscrupulous pirate acting purely for personal gain, completely devoid of the saving graces that gave Captain Nemo some nobility of character. Like Nemo, Ker Karraje plays "host" to unwilling French guests — but unlike Nemo, who manages to elude all pursuers — Karraje's criminal career is decisively thwarted by the combination of an international task force and the resistance of his French captives. Though also widely published and translated, Facing the Flag never achieved the lasting popularity of Twenty Thousand Leagues.

Closer in approach to the original Nemo — though offering less detail and complexity of characterization — is the rebel aeronaut Robur in Robur the Conqueror and its sequel Master of the World. Instead of the sea, Robur's medium is the sky: In these two novels he develops a pioneering helicopter and later a seaplane on wheels.

English translations
The novel was first translated into English in 1873 by Reverend Lewis Page Mercier. Mercier cut nearly a quarter of Verne's French text and committed hundreds of translating errors, sometimes drastically distorting  Verne's original (including uniformly mistranslating the French scaphandre — properly "diving suit" — as "cork-jacket", following a long-obsolete usage as "a type of lifejacket"). Some of these distortions may have been perpetrated for political reasons, such as Mercier's omitting the portraits of freedom fighters on the wall of Nemo's stateroom, a collection originally including Daniel O'Connell among other international figures. Nevertheless, Mercier's text became the standard English translation, and some later "re-translations" continued to recycle its mistakes, including mistranslating the title as "... under the Sea", rather than "... under the Seas".

In 1962, Anthony Bonner published a fresh, essentially complete translation of the novel with Bantam Classics. This edition also included a special introduction written by the sci-fi author Ray Bradbury, comparing Captain Nemo to Captain Ahab of Moby-Dick.

A significant modern revision of Mercier's translation appeared in 1966, prepared by Walter James Miller and published by Washington Square Press. Miller addressed many of Mercier's errors in the volume's preface and restored a number of his deletions in the text. In 1993, Miller collaborated with his fellow Vernian Frederick Paul Walter to produce "The Completely Restored and Annotated Edition", published in 1993 by the Naval Institute Press. Its text took advantage of Walter's unpublished translation, which Project Gutenberg later made available online.

In 1998, William Butcher issued a new, annotated translation with the title Twenty Thousand Leagues under the Seas, published by Oxford University Press. Butcher includes detailed notes, a comprehensive bibliography, appendices and a wide-ranging introduction studying the novel from a literary perspective. In particular, his original research on the two manuscripts studies the radical changes to the plot and to the character of Nemo urged on Verne by Hetzel, his publisher.

In 2010 Frederick Paul Walter issued a fully revised, newly researched translation, 20,000 Leagues Under the Seas: A World Tour Underwater. Complete with an extensive introduction, textual notes, and bibliography, it appeared in an omnibus of five of Walter's Verne translations titled Amazing Journeys: Five Visionary Classics and published by State University of New York Press.

Reception
The science fiction writer Theodore L. Thomas criticized the novel in 1961, claiming that "there is not a single bit of valid speculation" in the book and that "none of its predictions has come true". He described its depictions of Nemo's diving gear, underwater activities, and the Nautilus as "pretty bad, behind the times even for 1869 ... In none of these technical situations did Verne take advantage of knowledge readily available to him at the time." However, the notes to the 1993 translation point out that the errors noted by Thomas were in fact in Mercier's translation, not in the original.

Despite his criticisms, Thomas conceded: "Put them all together with the magic of Verne's story-telling ability, and something flames up. A story emerges that sweeps incredulity before it".

Adaptations and variations

Captain Nemo's nationality is presented in many feature film and video realizations as European. However, he's depicted as Indian by Omar Sharif in the 1973 European miniseries The Mysterious Island. Nemo also appears as an Indian in the 1916 silent film version of the novel (which adds elements from The Mysterious Island). Indian actor  Naseeruddin Shah plays Captain Nemo in the film The League of Extraordinary Gentlemen. The character is portrayed as Indian in the graphic novel. In Walt Disney's 20,000 Leagues Under the Sea (1954), a live-action Technicolor film of the novel, Captain Nemo seems European, albeit dark-complected. In the Disney adaptation, he's played by British actor James Mason, with — as in the novel itself — no mention of his being Indian. Disney's film script elaborates on background hints in Verne's original: in an effort to acquire Nemo's scientific secrets, his wife and son were tortured to death by an unnamed government overseeing the fictional prison camp of Rorapandi. This is the captain's motivation for sinking warships in the film. Also, Nemo's submarine confines her activities to a defined, circular section of the Pacific Ocean, unlike the movements of the original Nautilus.

Finally, Nemo is again depicted as Indian in the Soviet 3-episode TV film Captain Nemo (1975), which also includes some plot details from The Mysterious Island.

See also

 

References

External links

Twenty Thousand Leagues Under the Seas, trans. by F. P. Walter in 1991, made available by Project Gutenberg.
 , obsolete translation by Lewis Mercier, 1872Vingt Mille Lieues Sous Les Mers'' 1871 French edition at the digital library of the National Library of France
 
  Twenty Thousand Leagues Under the Sea, audio version 
 Manuscripts of Twenty Thousand Leagues Under the Sea in gallica.bnf.fr

1870 French novels
1870 science fiction novels
French adventure novels
French science fiction novels
Hard science fiction
Underwater novels
French novels adapted into films
French novels adapted into plays
French novels adapted into television shows
Science fiction novels adapted into films
Novels adapted into comics
Novels adapted into video games
Novels adapted into radio programs
 
French-language novels
Novels about pirates
Books about cephalopods
Atlantis in fiction
Submarines in fiction
Novels set in Greece
Novels set in India
Novels set in Japan
Novels set in New York City
Novels set in Norway
Novels set in Spain
Fiction set in the 1860s
Novels by Jules Verne